Severs may refer to:
Severs or Severians, an East Slavic tribe
Sever's disease
Severs Hotel (Muskogee, Oklahoma)

People with last name "Severs"
Chad Severs
Dennis Severs, previous resident of Dennis Severs' House
Michael Severs guitarist